Jackson is an "L" station on the CTA's Red Line in the Loop. Free transfers to Blue Line trains are available at this station via a lower level transfer tunnel to the Jackson/Dearborn subway station and farecard transfers to Purple, Orange, Brown and Pink Line trains are available via the  Loop Elevated station.

Like the  station, the northern extension of which was reconfigured as the  station, Jackson was originally double-length, with a third station mezzanine at Van Buren Street and Congress Parkway. The Van Buren-Congress mezzanine was closed on January 6, 1984, following the closure of the South Loop's main anchor, Sears, which had a direct entrance from the mezzanine. At the same time, the south end of the Jackson platform beyond the Jackson-Van Buren mezzanine was closed off with a plywood wall and both the platform area and mezzanine now remain, but abandoned. The street level entrances to the Van Buren-Congress mezzanine were removed when State Street was remodeled in 1997, replaced with access through grates, which can be seen on the sidewalks between Van Buren Street and Ida B. Wells Drive.

The accessible entrance is located on the west side of State Street between Jackson & Adams, just south of 220 State Street.

Bus connections
CTA
 1 Bronzeville/Union Station (Weekday Rush Hours only) 
 2 Hyde Park Express (Weekday Rush Hours only) 
 6 Jackson Park Express
 7 Harrison
 10 Museum of Science and Industry (Memorial Day through Labor Day only) 
 29 State
 36 Broadway
 62 Archer (Owl Service) 
 126 Jackson
 146 Inner Lake Shore/Michigan Express
 147 Outer DuSable Lake Shore Express
 151 Sheridan

Notes and references

Notes

References

External links

 Jackson/State Station Page at Chicago-'L'.org
 Train schedule (PDF) at CTA official site
 Jackson/State Station Page CTA official site
 Adams Street/Jackson Boulevard entrance from Google Maps Street View
 Van Buren Street/Jackson Boulevard entrance from Google Maps Street View

CTA Red Line stations
Railway stations in the United States opened in 1943